Esparron-de-Verdon ("Esparron of Verdon"; Occitan: Esparron de Verdon) is a commune in the Alpes-de-Haute-Provence department in the Provence-Alpes-Côte d'Azur region in Southeastern France. It is on the departmental border with Var, to the west of the Lake of Sainte-Croix. As of 2019, Esparron-de-Verdon had a population of 392.

Demographics

See also
Communes of the Alpes-de-Haute-Provence department

References

Communes of Alpes-de-Haute-Provence
Alpes-de-Haute-Provence communes articles needing translation from French Wikipedia